On the upper plate of that part of the lamina which is outside the vestibular membrane, the periosteum is thickened to form the spiral limbus, this ends externally in a concavity, the sulcus spiralis internus, which represents, on section, the form of the letter C.

References

External links
 Histology at uc.edu

Ear